This is a list of the number-one albums of the UK Dance Albums Chart.

 List of UK Dance Albums Chart number ones of 2005
 List of UK Dance Albums Chart number ones of 2006
 List of UK Dance Albums Chart number ones of 2007
 List of UK Dance Albums Chart number ones of 2008
 List of UK Dance Albums Chart number ones of 2009
 List of UK Dance Albums Chart number ones of 2010
 List of UK Dance Albums Chart number ones of 2011
 List of UK Dance Albums Chart number ones of 2012
 List of UK Dance Albums Chart number ones of 2013
 List of UK Dance Albums Chart number ones of 2014
 List of UK Dance Albums Chart number ones of 2015
 List of UK Dance Albums Chart number ones of 2016
 List of UK Dance Albums Chart number ones of 2017
 List of UK Dance Albums Chart number ones of 2018
 List of UK Dance Albums Chart number ones of 2019
 List of UK Dance Albums Chart number ones of 2020
 List of UK Dance Albums Chart number ones of 2021
 List of UK Dance Albums Chart number ones of 2022
 List of UK Dance Albums Chart number ones of 2023

See also
 Lists of UK Albums Chart number ones
 Lists of UK Dance Singles Chart number ones
 Lists of UK Album Downloads Chart number ones
 Lists of UK Independent Albums Chart number ones
 Lists of UK Rock & Metal Albums Chart number ones
 Lists of UK R&B Albums Chart number ones

External links
UK Dance Albums Top 40 at the Official Charts Company
UK Top 40 Dance Albums at BBC Radio 1